The 1974–75 Roller Hockey Champions Cup was the 10th edition of the Roller Hockey Champions Cup organized by CERH.

Voltregà achieved their second title.

Teams
The champions of the main European leagues, and Barcelona as title holders, played this competition, consisting in a double-legged knockout tournament. As Barcelona qualified also as Spanish champion, Voltregà joined also the competition.

Bracket

Source:

References

External links
 CERH website

1974 in roller hockey
1975 in roller hockey
Rink Hockey Euroleague